Conrad Reeder (1954) (also known as Connie Reeder Nichols) is an American singer, songwriter, writer and college professor. She was married to the late producer and recording engineer Roger Nichols for over thirty years.

Music career 
She was born in Columbus, Ohio, United States. Reeder sang for fifteen years with John Denver in live concerts, on television and recordings including Dreamland Express and It's About Time.  She sang live duets with Denver as well as performing as a background singer and stayed in contact with Denver's mother after he died in a plane crash.

She also co-wrote the Denver song "Thanks to You."

Reeder is credited as a writer or co-writer on all tracks of her husband's release, The Roger Nichols Project.
 She was signed to Motown's Morocco Records in the early 1980s, but the label folded before her first album was released. Reeder led her own band called Fugitive Blonde in Nashville, Tennessee the 1980s and 1990s, with an earlier Los Angeles version titled Big Blonde.

Writing career 
She was a featured columnist and article writer at EQ Magazine  in the 1990s, writing as C. Reeder. The column, The Demo Queen, often lampooned the trials involved in the process of recording demo tapes in quest of a record deal. Her writing sometimes takes a serious view of life and love, and a book, Memory Clouds: Good Grief Bad Grief, is available on Amazon.  Her plays have been staged in Florida and California (Graffiti).

Education 
Reeder graduated in 2008 from the University of New Orleans with a Master of Fine Arts degree in Creative Writing/Playwrighting.  Her thesis, Jack is Dead, was inspired by Denver's accidental death. She has taught as an adjunct professor at Palm Beach State College in Florida. Reeder is currently a Doctoral candidate at Pacifica Graduate Institute in Santa Barbara, California, and is also a lecturing professor at the Maui campus of the University of Hawaii.

References

External links 
Blog and website for Conrad Reeder.
C. Reeder Nichols On the Beach: Poems and Vignettes
.
Conrad Reeder aka Connie Reeder Nichols accepts a Special Merit Grammy Award on behalf of her husband Roger Nichols.
Conrad Reeder and Pam Wolfe's website for their musical Venus The Love Show.

Living people
1954 births
Musicians from Columbus, Ohio
Musicians from California